AHV may refer to:

Aboriginal Housing Victoria, Australia
Afrikaansche Handelsvereeniging, a 19th century Dutch trading company
Alters- und Hinterlassenenversicherung, Switzerland
Ash Vale railway station, UK (National Rail code AHV)